John Smythe  (died 1599/1600), of King's Lynn, Norfolk, was an English politician.

He was a Member (MP) of the Parliament of England for Richmond, Yorkshire in 1589.

References

English MPs 1589
16th-century deaths
People from King's Lynn
Year of birth missing
Year of death uncertain